Matej Rehák (born 15 February 1990) is a Slovak footballer who plays as a right back.

Career
He debuted for Spartak Trnava in home match against Ružomberok on 24 November 2012.

References

External links
Spartak Trnava profile

Corgoň Liga profile

1990 births
Living people
Association football defenders
Slovak footballers
FC Spartak Trnava players
Slovak Super Liga players